Samuel Okpodu (born 7 October 1962) is a Nigerian football manager.

Career
Okpodu was the head coach of the Nigeria women's national team at the 2003 FIFA Women's World Cup.

In March 2021, Okpodu was named head coach of Maryland Bobcats FC in the National Independent Soccer Association.

References

External links
 
 
 Samuel Okpodu at Soccerdonna.de 

1962 births
Living people
Nigerian football managers
Women's association football managers
Nigeria women's national football team managers
2003 FIFA Women's World Cup managers
National Independent Soccer Association coaches
Virginia Tech Hokies women's soccer coaches
NC State Wolfpack men's soccer players
Nigerian footballers